Kirill Aleksandrovich Novikov (born 14 January 1981) is a Russian professional football coach and a former player and referee. He is the manager of FC Neftekhimik Nizhnekamsk.

Club career
He made his professional debut in the Russian Second Division in 1999 for FC Dynamo-2 Moscow. He played 3 games for FC Dynamo Moscow in the UEFA Cup 2001–02.

Coaching career
On 8 October 2019 he was appointed caretaker manager of Russian Premier League club FC Dynamo Moscow. Previous manager Dmitri Khokhlov resigned 3 days prior, with Dynamo in 15th place in the table. On 8 November 2019, he was appointed Dynamo manager on a permanent basis. In his first 6 games, Dynamo won 4 times and tied twice, going up to the 7th place in the table. On 19 December 2019, he signed a 1.5-year contract with Dynamo.

On 29 September 2020, he resigned as Dynamo manager following a series of bad results.

On 13 January 2021, he was appointed manager of the FNL club FC Neftekhimik Nizhnekamsk.

Personal life
He is the son of Aleksandr Novikov. He had to retire from playing at a young age due to serious injuries.

References

1981 births
Footballers from Moscow
Living people
Russian footballers
Russia under-21 international footballers
Association football defenders
FC Dynamo Moscow players
Russian Premier League players
Russian football referees
Russian football managers
FC Dynamo Moscow managers
Russian Premier League managers